Haji Yunus  is an Indian politician and a member of the Legislative Assembly of Delhi in India. He represents the Mustafabad constituency of New Delhi and is a member of the Aam Admi Party political party.

Member of Legislative Assembly (2020 - present) 
Since 2020, he is an elected member of the 7th Delhi Assembly.

Committee assignments of Delhi Legislative Assembly 
 Member (2022-2023), Committee on Estimates

Electoral performance

See also

Seventh Legislative Assembly of Delhi

Aam Aadmi Party

External links
Haji Yunus Twitter

References 
 

Living people
Date of birth missing (living people)
Aam Aadmi Party politicians from Delhi
Year of birth missing (living people)
Delhi MLAs 2020–2025
Deobandis